Morley Garfield Kelly (or perhaps Marley) (May 4, 1892 – October 10, 1956) was an American politician and businessman.

Born in Watertown, South Dakota, Kelly graduated from Wadena High School in Wadena, Minnesota and served in the North Dakota Army National Guard. He worked in the newspaper business, as a linotype operator, and moved to Fond du Lac, Wisconsin in 1922. He was also in the lumber business. Kelly served in the Wisconsin State Senate from 1933 to 1937. In 1948, he was a candidate for the Wisconsin State Assembly, losing to Myrton H. Duel. He was a Democrat. He died in October 1956.

References

Politicians from Fond du Lac, Wisconsin
People from Watertown, South Dakota
People from Wadena, Minnesota
Democratic Party Wisconsin state senators
North Dakota National Guard personnel
United States Army soldiers
1892 births
1956 deaths
20th-century American politicians